Mrzygłód is a village in the administrative district of Gmina Sanok, within Sanok County, Subcarpathian Voivodeship, in south-eastern Poland.

Mrzygłód obtained town status in 1428, but it was downgraded before 1919.

References

Villages in Sanok County